Word of Honor may refer to:

 Word of Honor (1981 film), a 1981 film co-written by David Ackles
 Word of Honor (novel), a 1985 novel by Nelson DeMille
 Word of Honor (2003 film), a 2003 film starring Don Johnson and based on the DeMille novel
 Word of Honor (TV series), a 2021 streaming Chinese TV series adaption of the novel Tian Ya Ke by Priest

See also
 Palabra de honor, a 1939 Argentine comedy film by Luis Cesar Amadori
 Palabra de honor (album), a 1984 album by Luis Miguel Gallego Basteri